Vares may refer to:

Geography
 Vareš, a town and municipality in central Bosnia and Herzegovina
 Varès, a commune in south-western France
 Varés, a city in Lombardy
 Vareš Lake, an artificial lake of Bosnia and Herzegovina
 Sang-e Vares, a village in northern Iran

Fiction
 , a novel series by Reijo Mäki that has been made into a film series
 Jussi Vares, a fictional Finnish private detective and the antihero of the series
 Vares: Private Eye, the first installment in the Vares film series
 The Kiss of Evil, the third installment in the Vares film series

Other
Vares (surname)